The Great One Is Dead is Saccharine Trust's third LP, released in 2001 through Hazelwood Records. It was their first studio effort since We Became Snakes fifteen years earlier.

Initially recorded at Hazelwood Studios in Frankfurt, Germany and released by Hazelwood Records, it was re-released as a split release by Recess Records and Water Under the Bridge Records in 2017.

Track listing 

The Sinister Rain 	
Grotian Phraseology 	
The Sadness Of Apollo 	
Legends Die Behind The Wheel, At Least 	
Neruda's Wave 	
Birthing The Ancestors 	
Antecedent Satisfaction 	
This Is Wilmington 	
Nocturnal Ballets 	
Reggie's Plateau 	
Untitled No.2 (I Gave Another Dimension The Slip) 	
Ordinary Calvinistic 	
Untitled No.1 (The Creative Fluctuation) 	
The Great One Is Dead 	
Water on the Dancefloor 	
Against Faustus 	
Resuscitate The Worm 	
Now That You're Dead

Personnel 
Saccharine Trust
Joe Baiza – guitar, vocals
Jack Brewer – vocals
Brian Christopherson – drums
Chris Stein – bass guitar

References

External links 
 The Great One Is Dead at Discogs (list of releases)

2001 albums
Saccharine Trust albums